CMC Aviation was a charter airline based in Nairobi, Kenya at Wilson Airport. It was acquired by DAC Aviation International in August 2006 and was rebranded as DAC Aviation (EA) Limited in 2011.

Fleet
The CMC Aviation fleet included the following aircraft (as of 4 July 2009):

7 Bombardier Dash 8-100 (two aircraft are operated for ECHO, two aircraft are operated for the United Nations and one aircraft is  operated for Dove Air Services)
3 Bombardier Dash 8-300 (which are operated for the United Nations)

References

External links

Defunct airlines of Kenya
Airlines disestablished in 2011
Defunct charter airlines
Companies based in Nairobi
2011 disestablishments in Kenya